This is a list of railway stations served by the Palermo metropolitan railway service.

 Capaci
 Cardillo-Zen
 Carini
 Federico
 Fiera
 Francia
 Giachery
 Isola delle Femmine
 Palazzo Reale-Orleans
 Palermo Centrale
 Palermo Notarbartolo
 Piraineto
 Punta Raisi
 San Lorenzo Colli
 Tommaso Natale
 Vespri

Metro
Palermo